Alexis Arias Tuesta (born 13 December 1995) is a Peruvian professional footballer who plays as a midfielder for Melgar and the Peru national team.

International career
Arias represented the Peru U22 team at the 2015 Pan Am Games. He made his debut for the senior Peru national team in a friendly 2–0 loss to El Salvador on 27 March 2019.

References

External links
 
 
 AS Profile

1995 births
Living people
Sportspeople from Callao
Peruvian footballers
Peru international footballers
Peru youth international footballers
FBC Melgar footballers
Peruvian Primera División players
2021 Copa América players
Association football midfielders